This is a list of seasons completed by the Toronto Phantoms. The Phantoms were a professional arena football franchise of the Arena Football League (AFL), based in Toronto, Ontario, Canada. The team was founded in 1997 as the New York CityHawks. After two unsuccessful seasons in New York City, the team moved to Hartford, becoming the Sea Wolves. The Sea Wolves made the playoffs for the first time in 2000, where they lost in the wild card round. Prior to the 2001 season, the team moved to Toronto, where they became the Phantoms. The Phantoms made the playoffs for the first time in 2001, but they lost in the quarterfinal round. The Phantoms disbanded after the completion of the 2002 season. They played their home games at Air Canada Centre.

References
 
 
 

Arena Football League seasons by team
 
Toronto-related lists
Ontario sport-related lists
Connecticut sports-related lists
New York City sports-related lists